The Ringwood Public School District is a comprehensive community public school district that serves students in kindergarten through eighth grade from Ringwood in Passaic County, New Jersey, United States.

As of the 2020–21 school year, the district, comprised of four schools, had an enrollment of 1,045 students and 103.9 classroom teachers (on an FTE basis), for a student–teacher ratio of 10.1:1.

The district is classified by the New Jersey Department of Education as being in District Factor Group "GH", the third-highest of eight groupings. District Factor Groups organize districts statewide to allow comparison by common socioeconomic characteristics of the local districts. From lowest socioeconomic status to highest, the categories are A, B, CD, DE, FG, GH, I and J.

Students in public school for ninth through twelfth grades attend Lakeland Regional High School in Wanaque, which serves students from the Boroughs of Ringwood and Wanaque. As of the 2020–21 school year, the high school had an enrollment of 924 students and 81.7 classroom teachers (on an FTE basis), for a student–teacher ratio of 11.3:1.

Schools 
Schools in the district (with 2020–21 enrollment data from the National Center for Education Statistics) are:
Elementary schools
Peter Cooper Elementary School with 228 students in grades K-3 (built in 1963)
Timothy Johnson, Principal 
Robert Erskine Elementary School with 185 students in grades K-3 (built in 1960)
Gregg Festa, Principal
Eleanor G. Hewitt Intermediate School with 246 students in grades 4-5 (built in 1937 with an annex built in 1952 and trailers added in 1959)
Dr. Kevin Brentnall, Principal
Middle school
Martin J. Ryerson Middle School with 389 students in grades 6-8 (built in 1970)
Eric R. Erler, Principal

Administration 
Core members of the district's administration are:
Dr. Nicholas Bernice, Superintendent of Schools
Robert Brown, Business Administrator / Board Secretary

Board of education
The district's board of education is comprised of nine members who set policy and oversee the fiscal and educational operation of the district through its administration. As a Type II school district, the board's trustees are elected directly by voters to serve three-year terms of office on a staggered basis, with three seats up for election each year held (since 2012) as part of the November general election. The board appoints a superintendent to oversee the district's day-to-day operations and a business administrator to supervise the business functions of the district.

References

External links 
Ringwood Public Schools

School Data for the Ringwood Public Schools, National Center for Education Statistics
Lakeland Regional High School

Ringwood, New Jersey
New Jersey District Factor Group GH
School districts in Passaic County, New Jersey